The Dacia SupeRNova was a subcompact/supermini car manufactured by Romanian auto manufacturer Dacia from the year 2000 to 2003.

History

It was a transversely mounted, front-engined, front wheel drive layout under the compact liftback body of the facelifted 1995 Dacia Nova.  The SupeRNova was the first model Automobile Dacia released after the company had been taken over by Renault, in 1999. The improvement over the Nova model consisted in a new Renault engine and gearbox, replacing the old Cleon-Fonte based unit and Romanian-designed gearbox.

The "new" engine was the catalyzed and multi-port injected version of the E7J inline-four, joined to a manual five-speed JH3 gearbox. Equipment was better than it had been in the Nova model, as air conditioning, alloy wheels and electric front windows were available for the more upmarket versions. SuperNova was sold in five different trim levels: "Europa", "Confort", "Rapsodie", top version "Clima" and special edition "Campus". The car was Euro 2 emission regulation compliant, as regulations for domestically produced automobiles required. Some of the 2003 versions were Euro 3 compliant.

Engines

See also
Dacia Solenza
Dacia Nova

References

External links

Dacia SupeRNova at AutomobileRomanesti.ro

SuperNova
Cars of Romania
Front-wheel-drive vehicles
Subcompact cars
Euro NCAP superminis
Hatchbacks
Cars introduced in 2000